John Michael Loh (born March 14, 1938) is a retired four-star general in the United States Air Force (USAF) who last served as Commander, Air Combat Command from June 1992 to July 1995. His other four-star assignment include being the 24th Vice Chief of Staff of the Air Force from June 1990 to March 1991, and Commander, Tactical Air Command from March 1991 to June 1992.

Loh graduated from Gonzaga College High School, Washington, D.C., in 1956 and the United States Air Force Academy in 1960. He has a master's degree in aeronautical engineering from Massachusetts Institute of Technology. He commanded the Aeronautical Systems Division, Air Force Systems Command. He also commanded Tactical Air Command, then upon its deactivation, became the first commander of Air Combat Command. He is a command pilot with more than 4,300 flying hours, primarily in fighter aircraft, and flew 204 combat missions in the Vietnam War. Loh retired from the USAF on July 1, 1995. He founded JML & Associates, Inc. the same year.

Education
1956 Graduated from Gonzaga College High School, Washington, D.C.
1960 Received a Bachelor of Science degree in Engineering Science, U.S. Air Force Academy, Colorado Springs, Colorado
1966 U.S. Air Force Fighter Weapons School, Nellis Air Force Base, Nevada
1968 U.S. Air Force Test Pilot School, Edwards Air Force Base, California
1973 Received a Master of Science degree in Aeronautical Engineering, Massachusetts Institute of Technology, Massachusetts
1978 Air War College, Maxwell Air Force Base, Alabama

Assignments
June 1960 – January 1961, student officer, primary pilot training, Bainbridge Air Force Base, Georgia
January 1961 – October 1961, student officer, basic pilot training, Craig Air Force Base, Alabama
October 1961 – July 1962, student officer, intercept pilot training, Perrin Air Force Base, Texas
July 1962 – June 1963, pilot, 76th Fighter Interceptor Squadron, Westover Air Force Base, Massachusetts
September 1965 – April 1966, pilot, 33rd Tactical Fighter Wing, Eglin Air Force Base, Florida
April 1966 – July 1967, pilot, 40th Tactical Fighter Squadron, Eglin Air Force Base, Florida
July 1967 – October 1968, test pilot, USAF Test Pilot School, Edwards Air Force Base, California
October 1968 – November 1969, pilot, 389th Tactical Fighter Squadron, 366th Tactical Fighter Wing, Da Nang Air Base, South Vietnam
November 1969 – May 1972, fighter requirements staff officer, Fighter Division, Directorate of Operational Requirements, Office of the Deputy Chief of Staff, Research and Development, Headquarters U.S. Air Force, Washington, D.C.
June 1972 – August 1973, graduate student, Aeronautical Engineering, Massachusetts Institute of Technology
August 1973 – January 1975, YF-16/YF-17 program manager, Headquarters Aeronautical Systems Division, Wright-Patterson Air Force Base, Ohio
January 1975 – July 1977, director of projects, F-16 Program, Aeronautical Systems Division, Wright-Patterson Air Force Base, Ohio
August 1977 – June 1978, student, Air War College, Maxwell Air Force Base, Alabama
June 1978 – July 1979, assistant deputy commander for operations, 23rd Tactical Fighter Wing, England Air Force Base, Louisiana
July 1979 – September 1980, deputy commander for operations, 23rd Tactical Fighter Wing, England Air Force Base, Louisiana
October 1980 – April 1981, vice commander, 23rd Tactical Fighter Wing, England Air Force Base, Louisiana
April 1981 – April 1983, assistant deputy chief of staff for requirements, Headquarters Tactical Air Command, Langley Air Force Base, Virginia
April 1983 – July 1984, assistant deputy chief of staff for operations, Headquarters Tactical Air Command, Langley Air Force Base, Virginia
July 1984 – July 1985, deputy chief of staff for requirements, Headquarters Tactical Air Command, Langley Air Force Base, Virginia
August 1985 – July 1987, director of operational requirements, Office of the Deputy Chief of Staff for Research, Development and Acquisition, Headquarters U.S. Air Force, Washington, D.C.
July 1987 – July 1988, vice commander, Aeronautical Systems Division, Wright-Patterson Air Force Base, Ohio
August 1988 – June 1990, commander, Aeronautical Systems Division, Wright-Patterson Air Force Base, Ohio
June 1990 – March 1991, vice chief of staff, Headquarters U.S. Air Force, Washington, D.C.
March 1991 – June 1992, commander, Headquarters Tactical Air Command, Langley Air Force Base, Virginia
June 1992 – July 1995, commander, Air Combat Command, Langley Air Force Base, Virginia

Major awards and decorations
  Air Force Distinguished Service Medal
  Legion of Merit with oak leaf cluster
  Distinguished Flying Cross
  Meritorious Service Medal
  Air Medal with seven oak leaf clusters
  Air Force Commendation Medal
  Vietnam Service Medal with silver service star
  Vietnam Gallantry Cross Unit Citation

Other achievements
Loh was awarded the Daedalian Fellowship for graduate study in 1972. Also, he is the recipient of the 1972 Air Force Research and Development Award, and the Air Force's Eugene M. Zuckert Senior Management Award for 1989. In 2009 he honored by the United States Air Force Academy with their Distinguished Graduate award.

Effective dates of promotion

References

1938 births
Living people
United States Air Force Academy alumni
Chiefs of Staff of the United States Air Force
Recipients of the Air Force Distinguished Service Medal
Recipients of the Legion of Merit
Recipients of the Distinguished Flying Cross (United States)
United States Air Force personnel of the Vietnam War
MIT School of Engineering alumni
U.S. Air Force Test Pilot School alumni
Recipients of the Air Medal
Recipients of the Order of the Sword (United States)
Vice Chiefs of Staff of the United States Air Force
Gonzaga College High School alumni
Air War College alumni